Hartfield is an unincorporated community in Middlesex County, Virginia, United States. Hartfield has a post office with ZIP code 23071, which opened on September 5, 1889.

William Churchill, patriarch of one of the first Virginia's colonial families, built Wilton House in Hartfield in 1763. Wilton House is a T-shaped Georgian plantation house near the Piankatank River in the Tidewater region on Virginia's Middle Peninsula. It's now open as a guest house.

References

Unincorporated communities in Middlesex County, Virginia
Unincorporated communities in Virginia